The Fine Art of Murder is the sixth studio album by Florida death metal band Malevolent Creation. It was released on October 27, 1998 via Pavement Music. Phil Fasciana and Rob Barrett originally planned to do all the bass tracks on the album but Brett Hoffman convinced them to let Gordon Simms join the band.

Track listing

Personnel
 Bret Hoffman - Vocals
 Rob Barrett - Lead guitar
 Phil Fasciana - Rhythm guitar, keyboard on "The Fine Art Of Murder"
 Gordon Simms - Bass
 Dave Culross - Drums

References

Malevolent Creation albums
1998 albums